Dave Kerpen is an American author and entrepreneur. Kerpen first received media attention in the Boston sports market in the late 1990s for his sales strategies at professional sporting events. He went on to appear as a contestant on the 2003 Fox reality television series Paradise Hotel and later gained notice for his "sponsored wedding" in 2006. He is the author of the 2011 New York Times bestseller Likeable Social Media, as well as Likeable Business (2012), Likeable Leadership (2013), and The Art of People: 11 Simple People Skills To Get Everything You Want (2016).

He founded Likeable Media, a social media marketing agency, in 2007, and later launched Likeable Local, serving thousands of small businesses. The company was acquired by 10Pearls in April 2021. Kerpen also cofounded Apprentice, a platform that connects entrepreneurs with college students and Remembering Live, a virtual memorial service company.

Career

Boston sports media celebrity
For a period in the late 1990s and early 2000s, Kerpen was well known in the Boston professional sports vending industry, often referred to as "the Crunch 'n Munch guy". Kerpen gained prominence due to his unique vending pitches, featuring dancing and singing, at Fleet Center, Fenway Park, and Gillette Stadium. Former Boston Celtics coach Rick Pitino once had Kerpen ejected from Fleet Center, claiming that he was too distracting to his players.

Reality television
In 2003, Kerpen appeared as a contestant on the Fox reality show Paradise Hotel, which featured competitors vying to stay in the hotel as long as possible. Each week couples paired off by electing to share a room, and the odd person out had to leave the hotel, ultimately concluding with one male and one female winner. Kerpen was a runner-up in the program and the only finalist not to receive prize money. In the finale, female winner Charla Pihlstrom had the option of splitting her $250,000 prize money with Kerpen but elected to keep it for herself.

Business and political career
In 2006 Kerpen co-founded, with his wife Caroline Kerpen, the social media marketing firm Likeable Media in New York City. He is also the author of Likeable Social Media: How to Delight Your Customers, Create an Irresistible Brand, and Be Generally Amazing on Facebook (& Other Social Networks), featured on the New York Times bestseller list in June 2011. Kerpen's writings on the industry have appeared in Forbes, Inc Magazine, Mashable, The Huffington Post, and other outlets, and he is a featured speaker on social media for publisher McGraw-Hill.

In March 2009 Kerpen formed an exploratory committee to determine whether to run for the position of borough president of Queens. Following a few weeks of campaigning, he left the race, due to the entrenched strength of incumbent Helen Marshall. He was previously expected to run for New York City Council in 2009, but he abandoned that bid when he decided to seek the borough presidency. During the spring of 2017, Kerpen ventured back into local politics when he ran for and won a seat on his district's School Board.

Kerpen published Likeable Business: Why Today's Consumers Demand More and How Leaders Can Deliver in October 2012. While Likeable Media continued to grow and work with brands including, Verizon, Neutrogena, Entenmann's, Grubhub, and more, Kerpen saw an opportunity to help small businesses. In 2013 Kerpen started Likeable Local specifically to support small business owners leveraging the power of social media. 

Kerpen published The Art of People: The 11 Simple People Skills That Will Get You Everything You Want in March 2016, a modern take on Dale Carnegie's classic How to Win Friends and Influence People. Kerpen's book includes steps to help readers improve their people skills both personally and professionally. Kerpen has since expanded his speaking engagements, including keynotes at conferences across the globe.

Personal
Kerpen was born in Brooklyn, New York, and attended Hunter College High School, then Boston University. His marriage to his wife Carrie was held at KeySpan Park following a Brooklyn Cyclones minor league baseball game on July 8, 2006, with numerous companies sponsoring the event, including 1-800-Flowers and Entenmann's. He resides in Port Washington, New York, with his wife and three children.

References

External links
 

Participants in American reality television series
People from Brooklyn
Living people
Year of birth missing (living people)
American technology chief executives
Boston University alumni
People from Port Washington, New York
Hunter College High School alumni